Star Crystal is a 1985 video game published by Ba'rac Limited.

Gameplay
Star Crystal is a game in which the Spinward Marches of the Traveller role-playing game is the setting of a text adventure.

Reception
Johnny L. Wilson reviewed the game for Computer Gaming World, and stated that "The scenario is well-conceived and the scientific thesis held by the deceased offers stimulation for its own campaign."

References

1985 video games